Robert Gordon Menzies (born 10 November 1951) was a Scottish footballer who began his career with amateur side Kilsyth St Pats before turning 'senior' with Dumbarton.  After three seasons he joined the 'junior' ranks, playing with Kirkintilloch Rob Roy then Petershill.

References

1951 births
Scottish footballers
Dumbarton F.C. players
Scottish Football League players
Living people
Association football midfielders